

History 
Knowledge Institute of Technology (KIOT) was founded in 2009, by Knowledge Institute of Technology Trust.  KIOT is affiliated to Anna University, Chennai  and approved by AICTE, New Delhi. 

The institute offers undergraduate and postgraduate courses in various engineering disciplines, and also offers a Master of Business Administration (MBA) program.

B.E Programs 

 Mechanical Engineering
 Electrical and Electronics Engineering
 Electronics and Communication Engineering
 Computer Science and Engineering  
 Civil Engineering

M.E Programs 

 VLSI Design 
 Computer Science and Engineering  
 Industrial Safety
 Embedded System Technologies

References
 Knowledge Institute of Technology

External links
 Knowledge Institute of Technology official site
 Knowledge Institute of Technology alumni site

Engineering colleges in Tamil Nadu
Colleges affiliated to Anna University
Education in Salem district
Educational institutions established in 2009
2009 establishments in Tamil Nadu